Curt Smith is an English musician and member of Tears for Fears.

Curt Smith or Curtis Smith may also refer to:

Curtis P. Smith (1863–1919), attorney, civic leader and mayor of Dallas
Curt Smith (author) (born 1951), American author and speechwriter
Curt Smith (baseball) (born 1986), Dutch baseball player
Curt Smith (basketball) (born 1971), American basketball player
Curtis Smith (drag racer) (fl. 1970s–2010s), NHRA and IHRA drag racer

Curtis-Smith may refer to:
Anne Curtis (born Anne Curtis-Smith, 1985), Filipino-Australian actress
C. Curtis-Smith (1941–2014), American composer and pianist
Jasmine Curtis-Smith (born 1994), Filipino-Australian actress

See also
Curtismith (born 1993), Filipino singer
Kurtwood Smith (sometimes called "Kurt"; born 1943), American actor
Smith Curtis (1855–1949), Canadian lawyer and political figure